Zhao Jin (born 17 March 1988) is a Chinese swimmer. She competed for China at the 2012 Summer Olympics.

See also
China at the 2012 Summer Olympics - Swimming

References

1988 births
Living people
Chinese female breaststroke swimmers
Swimmers from Shanxi
Swimmers at the 2012 Summer Olympics
Olympic swimmers of China
People from Datong
Medalists at the FINA World Swimming Championships (25 m)
Asian Games medalists in swimming
Swimmers at the 2010 Asian Games
Asian Games silver medalists for China
Medalists at the 2010 Asian Games
21st-century Chinese women